The Hôtel de Forbin is a listed hôtel particulier in Aix-en-Provence.

Location
It is located at 20, Cours Mirabeau in Aix-en-Provence.

History
It was designed by architect Pierre Pavillon (1612-1670) in 1656. It was built for César de Milan, who served as a legal advisor to the Parliament of Aix-en-Provence. In 1672, it went to the Forbin family thanks to a marriage.

Pauline Bonaparte (1780–1825) was a visitor in 1807, as was Joseph Fouché (1759-1820) in 1810.

It now houses the LCL S.A. bank.

Heritage significance
It has been listed as a monument historique since 5 November 1990.

References

Hôtels particuliers in Aix-en-Provence
Monuments historiques of Aix-en-Provence
Houses completed in 1656
Hôtel de Forbin
1656 establishments in France